Patrik Bärtschi (born 20 August 1984) is a Swiss professional ice hockey Winger currently playing for ZSC Lions of the National League A (NLA).

Playing career
Bärtschi was drafted by the Pittsburgh Penguins in the seventh round of the 2002 NHL Entry Draft, going 202nd overall. Bärtschi attended several training camps with the Penguins, but instead chose to continue his career in Switzerland.

From 2001 until 2006, Bärtschi was a member of the Kloten Flyers. He skated with SC Bern from 2006 until 2009. Bärtschi became a member of the ZSC Lions in March 2009. He led the Lions in points (53) during the 2009–10 NLA season.

Career statistics

Regular season and playoffs

International

References

External links

1984 births
Swiss ice hockey right wingers
SC Bern players
EHC Kloten players
Living people
Pittsburgh Penguins draft picks
ZSC Lions players